Çakırpınar is a village in the Sason District, Batman Province, Turkey. The village is populated by Arabs and had a population of 537 in 2021.

The hamlets of Arpacık, Çatmalı, Dağdelen, Dağlıca, Deliktaş, Konaklı, Yazlıca and Yongalı are attached to the village.

References 

Villages in Sason District
Arab settlements in Batman Province